Charl Francois Marais  (born 2 September 1970) is a South African former rugby union player.

Playing career
Marais matriculated at Grey College and represented  at the annual Craven Week tournaments in 1987 and 1988.

Marais made his test match debut for the Springboks against  at the Boet Erasmus Stadium in Port Elizabeth in 1999 and he also played in the second test against Italy. During the 2000 rugby season, Marais played ten test matches for the Springboks and was a member of the end-of-year squad that toured to Argentina, Britain and Ireland. He also played three tour matches for the Springboks.

Test history

See also
List of South Africa national rugby union players – Springbok no. 685

References

1970 births
Living people
South African rugby union players
South Africa international rugby union players
Free State Cheetahs players
Western Province (rugby union) players
Stormers players
Alumni of Grey College, Bloemfontein
Rugby union players from the Free State (province)
Rugby union hookers